Saldeh may refer to:
 Saldeh-e Olya
 Saldeh-e Sofla